The Albano Machado Airport  is a public airport southeast of Huambo, the capital of Huambo Province, Angola. It was formerly named Nova Lisboa Airport, after the former name of the city.

Airlines and destinations

During July and August 1975, the airport operated as a bridge between Angola and Lisbon while the Angolan Civil War raged around the city. Several airlines operated special flights into the city: Swissair (Douglas DC-10), Transinternational Airlines (Douglas DC-8), TAP Portugal (Boeing 707s, 747), Perfect Tours (Boeing 707), and Overseas National Airways (DC-8).

Accidents and incidents
On 3 September 1970. Douglas DC-3 G-AVPW of Hunting Surveys was substantially damaged when it was subjected to ground fire on take-off. Hydraulic lines were damaged and the fuel tanks ruptured. A successful emergency landing was made at Luanda Airport. The aircraft was repaired and returned to service.
On 14 September 2011, 17 people, including 11 military personnel, died when an Angolan Air Force EMB-120 crashed shortly after take-off from Albano Machado airport. The plane was headed to Luanda Airport.

See also
List of airports in Angola
Transport in Angola

Gallery

References

External links

OurAirports - Albano Machado Airport

Airports in Angola
Huambo